Diaphorographis is a genus of lichen-forming fungi in the family Graphidaceae. It has two species. The genus was circumscribed in 2009 by lichenologists Alan W. Archer and Klaus Kalb, with D. queenslandica as the type species. Collectively, the genus is found in northern Queensland, New Caledonia, and the Solomon Islands. Although the genus was originally reported to not contain any lichen products, a later reexamination of the type species revealed the presence of protocetraric acid.

Species

 Diaphorographis neocaledonica 
 Diaphorographis queenslandica

References

Graphidaceae
Lichen genera
Ostropales genera
Taxa described in 2009
Taxa named by Alan W. Archer
Taxa named by John Alan Elix